Ayoub Ahmani Sørensen (born 12 April 1988) is a Danish-Moroccan footballer who plays as a winger for Frem in the Danish 2nd Division.

Club career
Ayoub moved with his family from Marrakech in Morocco to Copenhagen in Denmark at a young age. He began his career with Frem, and was scouted by Brøndby in 2005, where he joined and played 55 games and scored 7 goals for the reserves. Then he joined Danish 1st Division side Hvidovre IF in September 2007, and played his first professional match on 16 January 2009. He left Hvidovre IF and joined to Lyngby Boldklub. 

In October 2010, Sørensen was subjected to racism from opposing Hvidovre IF-fans. Lyngby toned down the abuse after the match, and chose not to report the incident. This was criticised by representatives of the Danish Football Association (DBU) and Spillerforeningen, the union for professional footballers in Denmark.

On 19 July 2013, Sørensen signed a two-year contract with SønderjyskE after a successful trial. He left the club in January 2016, after being plagued by injuries throughout his contract term.

Sørensen went on trial with his former club Hvidovre in January 2019, after taking a break from football to focus on his rehabilitation for some years. He failed to win a contract at the club, but instead signed with his youth club Frem later in the year. In February 2020, he signed a six-month contract extension.

International career
In 2006, Sørensen received his first call-up to the Morocco national under-20 football team for a training camp, and he played his first games in January 2008.

References

External links 
 

1989 births
Living people
Danish men's footballers
Moroccan footballers
Footballers from Casablanca
Hvidovre IF players
Lyngby Boldklub players
SønderjyskE Fodbold players
Danish Superliga players
Association football forwards
Association football midfielders
Sportspeople from Marrakesh
Moroccan emigrants to Denmark
Morocco under-20 international footballers
Danish 2nd Division players
Brøndby IF players
Boldklubben Frem players